Septoria menthae is a fungal plant pathogen infecting mint.

References

External links 
 Index Fungorum
 USDA ARS Fungal Database

menthae
Fungi described in 1875
Fungal plant pathogens and diseases
Mint diseases